William Bianchini (born 16 October 1960) is a retired Luxembourgian football midfielder.

References

1960 births
Living people
Luxembourgian people of Italian descent
Luxembourgian footballers
FA Red Boys Differdange players
Jeunesse Esch players
Association football midfielders
Luxembourg international footballers